Charles Grey, 1st Earl Grey,  (circa 23 October 1729 – 14 November 1807) was a British Army general in the 18th century and a scion of the noble House of Grey. He was a distinguished soldier in a generation of exceptionally capable military personnel, serving crucially in the Seven Years' War (1756–1763), the American Revolutionary War and the French Revolutionary Wars.

He served in the American War of Independence (1775–1783), rising to be Commander-in-Chief of the British forces in America. Following the Battle of Paoli in Pennsylvania in 1777 he became known as "No-flint Grey" for ordering his men to extract the flints from their muskets during a night approach and to fight with bayonets only. He later fought in the French Revolutionary Wars (1792–1802), capturing Martinique as leverage to force the Treaty of Amiens, and was appointed as Governor of Guernsey.

Early life 
Grey was born at his family estate Howick Hall, 30 miles north of Newcastle upon Tyne and one mile from the North Sea. His exact birthdate is unknown, but he was baptized 23 October 1729, so he was probably born in October. He was the third son of Sir Henry Grey, 1st Baronet, of Howick and his wife Lady Hannah Grey (née Wood), daughter of Thomas Wood of Fallodon in Northumberland.  Because he had two older brothers, Grey did not expect to inherit his father's titles and estates, so he pursued a career in the military. His two older brothers Sir Henry and Thomas both died without issue, leaving him as the viable heir.

Military career 
In 1744, with financial assistance from his father, Grey purchased a commission as an ensign in the 6th Regiment of Foot. He soon went to Scotland with the Sixth Regiment to suppress the Jacobite Rising of 1745. Following victory there, the Sixth Regiment spent the next few years in Gibraltar. In December 1752, he purchased a lieutenancy in the Sixth Regiment. In March 1755, he formed a new independent company and became their captain. Two months later, he purchased a captaincy in the 20th Regiment of Foot (subsequently titled 'East Devonshire Regiment', and in 1881 the Lancashire Fusiliers), in which James Wolfe served as lieutenant colonel. In 1757, while with Wolfe's regiment, he participated in the unsuccessful attack on Rochefort.

Seven Years' War 

In the Seven Years' War, he served as adjutant in the staff of Duke Ferdinand of Brunswick and on 1 August 1759 was wounded at Minden. On 14 October 1760 he commanded a Light Company at the Battle of Campen, where he was again wounded. One year later, as Lt. Colonel of the 98th Regiment of Foot (1761), he participated in the Capture of Belle Île, off the coast of Brittany. Next, he served at the Battle of Havana in 1762. Later, he was on the staff of Wilhelm, Count of Schaumburg-Lippe during the Spanish invasion of Portugal (1762). In 1763 he retired on half-pay, but in 1772 he received a promotion to Colonel and served as aide-de-camp to King George III.

American War of Independence 
During the American War of Independence he was one of the more successful army leaders. He was rapidly promoted, becoming a major general in 1777 and commanded the 3rd Brigade at the Battle of Brandywine. He earned the nickname "No-flint Grey" after the Battle of Paoli in the same campaign when, to ensure surprise in the night attack on an American encampment, it was said he ordered the infantry of his command to remove the flints from their muskets and use only their bayonets. In fact, he only directed that muskets should be unloaded.  He commanded the 3rd Brigade again at the Battle of Germantown and the Battle of Monmouth. Immediately following his disastrous retreat at the Battle of Monmouth, the American General Charles Lee excused himself from criticism by complaining that he had directly faced the advance Grey's 3rd brigade, suggesting the Earl was a feared and respected opponent by this stage in the war.

In 1778 he led raids at New Bedford on 5–6 September, destroying nearly all the shipping and burning twenty shops and twenty-two houses in the town, and Martha's Vineyard, where between 10 and 15 September, the British carried off all the sheep, swine, cattle and oxen that they could find with promise of payment in New York. On 27 September 1778, Grey used the same methods as he had at the Battle of Paoli in a night attack at Old Tappan, New Jersey, which came to be known as the Baylor Massacre. He was recalled to England and became a knight of the Order of the Bath and a lieutenant general. He later was appointed commander-in-chief of the British troops in America, but hostilities ended before he could take command.

French Revolutionary Wars 

At the outset of the French Revolutionary Wars in 1793, Sir Charles Grey was appointed commander of the West Indian expedition. First, however, he went to Ostend to participate in the relief of Nieuwpoort, Belgium. In early 1794, he and Admiral Sir John Jervis led a British force to capture Martinique. The campaign lasted about six weeks with the British capturing Fort Royal and Fort Saint Louis on 22 March, and Fort Bourbon two days later. The British then occupied Martinique until the Treaty of Amiens returned the island to the French in 1802. Grey was later involved in the invasion of Guadeloupe. Between the years of 1797 and 1807 General Grey held the position of Governor of Guernsey.

Peerage 
In late 1794 he returned to England. From 1798 to 1799 he served as Commander of the Southern District, retiring in 1799. In acknowledgment of his service, he was raised in January 1801 to the peerage as Baron Grey, of Howick in the County of Northumberland. In 1806, he was created Earl Grey and Viscount Howick, in the County of Northumberland. He died the next year, at the age of 78.

Family 
A member of the House of Grey, he married Elizabeth Grey (1744–1822), daughter of George Grey of Southwick (1713–1746). Their children were:

 Charles Grey, 2nd Earl Grey, (1764–1845), Prime Minister of the United Kingdom and abolisher of slavery, married Mary Elizabeth Ponsonby.
 Sir George Grey, 1st Baronet of Fallodon, KCB (1767–1828), Flag Captain under Admiral Jervis, Flag Captain of King George III's Royal Yacht (1801–04), married Mary Whitbread, daughter of Samuel Whitbread (1720–1796).
 Bishop Edward Grey (1782–1837) Bishop of Hereford married firstly Charlotte Elizabeth Croft, secondly Elizabeth Adair, and thirdly Eliza Innes.
 Sir Henry George Grey, (1766–1845) GCH GCB, Colonel in the 13th Light Dragoons, who married Charlotte Des Voeux (1789–1882).
 Lady Elizabeth Grey (1765–1846) married Samuel Whitbread.
 Lt. Col. William Grey (1777–1817) married Maria Shirreff.
 Lady Hannah Althea Grey (1785–1832) married firstly George Edmund Byron Bettesworth and secondly Edward 'Bear' Ellice MP.

Grey and his wife brought up Eliza Courtney, the illegitimate daughter of their son Charles with Georgiana Cavendish, Duchess of Devonshire.

Sources

References

External links

|-

British Army lieutenant generals
Earls Grey
Charles
Knights Companion of the Order of the Bath
1729 births
1807 deaths
Members of the Privy Council of the United Kingdom
British Army personnel of the American Revolutionary War
Younger sons of baronets
British Army personnel of the Seven Years' War
Royal Warwickshire Fusiliers officers
Lancashire Fusiliers officers
3rd The King's Own Hussars officers
Gloucestershire Regiment officers
8th King's Royal Irish Hussars officers
7th Dragoon Guards officers
Parents of prime ministers of the United Kingdom
Peers of the United Kingdom created by George III
People from Howick, Northumberland
Military personnel from Northumberland